Pitcairnia nobilis is a plant species in the genus Pitcairnia. This species is native to Ecuador.

References

nobilis
Flora of Ecuador